26 Cygni is a single star in the northern constellation of Cygnus. It has the Bayer designation e Cygni, while 26 Cygni is the Flamsteed designation. This star is visible to the naked eye as a faint, yellow-hued point of light with an apparent visual magnitude of 5.12. It is located around  distant from the Sun, based on parallax measurements. The radial velocity is close to negligible, being measured at −0.3 km/s.

This object is an evolved giant star with a stellar classification of G8 III; a star that has used up its core hydrogen and left the main sequence. It is most likely (88% chance) on the horizontal branch, in which case stellar modelling yields an estimated 2.44 times the mass of the Sun and 22 times the Sun's radius. It is radiating 205 times the luminosity of the Sun from its enlarged photosphere at an effective temperature of 4,700 K.

There is a magnitude 8.94 visual companion at an angular separation of  along a position angle of 150°, as of 2014.

References

G-type giants
Horizontal-branch stars
Double stars
Cygnus (constellation)
J20012157+5006167
Cygni, e
Cygni, 26
BD+49 3158
190147
098571
7660